Emmons Pond is a small lake located southeast of the City of Oneonta in Delaware County, New York. Emmons Pond drains north-northwest via an unnamed creek that flows into the Susquehanna River.

See also
 List of lakes in New York

References 

Lakes of New York (state)
Lakes of Delaware County, New York